The former First Church of Christ, Scientist is a historic Christian Science church building located at 440 Elm Avenue, Long Beach, California, United States. Built in 1913, it was designed in the Classical Revival-style of architecture by noted Los Angeles architect Elmer Grey. 

The Long Beach city ordinance designating First Church of Christ, Scientist former building at 440 Elm Avenue as Historic Landmark No. 16.52.580 stated that: "First Church of Christ Scientist was Long Beach's first Christian Science Church. As such, it established an important religious institution in this city. Additionally, this church was one of the few downtown churches to survive the 1933 earthquake relatively undamaged and, therefore, is one of the oldest churches in Long Beach."

The building was sold in 1989 to the First Christian Church. First Church of Christ, Scientist, now holds services at 3629 Atlantic Avenue, in Long Beach.

See also
 List of City of Long Beach historic landmarks
 List of former Christian Science churches, societies and buildings
 Second Church of Christ, Scientist (Long Beach, California)

References

Churches in Long Beach, California
Elmer Grey church buildings
Former Christian Science churches, societies and buildings in California
Neoclassical architecture in California
Churches completed in 1913
1913 establishments in California
Neoclassical church buildings in the United States